Umar ibn Umar was the Muslim Wali (Governor) of Septimania and the Upper March, administrative divisions in the Islamic Emirate of Córdoba. He hailed from the Hejaz region and belonged to the Arab Banu Khazraj tribe. He governed from 747 to about 755 and lost Nîmes, Agde, Béziers and Melguelh in 752, but Narbonne, the capital, resisted for about seven years.

Umar died of natural causes in 755 while he was on a campaign in Aquitaine. He was succeeded by Abd ar-Rahman ibn Uqba.

8th-century people from al-Andalus
Upper March
8th-century people from the Umayyad Caliphate
People from the Emirate of Córdoba
8th-century Arabs
Umayyad governors of Al-Andalus